Alpheus Dimmick (March 22, 1787January 17, 1865) was an American lawyer and politician.

Alpheus Dimmick graduated from Yale College in 1810.  He commenced the practice of law in Bloomingburgh, Sullivan County, New York, where he continued to reside through life.  In 1828 he was a member of the New York State Legislature, and was subsequently county judge and surrogate. In all the relations of life he was respected for his uprightness and integrity.  He was the father of Samuel E. Dimmick.

He died in Bloomingburgh, aged 77 years.

External links

1787 births
1865 deaths
Yale College alumni
New York (state) lawyers
Members of the New York State Assembly
19th-century American politicians
19th-century American lawyers